Williamson Glacier is a glacier draining northeastward from Law Dome into Colvocoresses Bay. Delineated by G.D. Blodgett (1955) from air photos taken by U.S. Navy Operation Highjump (1946–47). Named by Advisory Committee on Antarctic Names (US-ACAN) after John G. Williamson, crew member on the sloop Vincennes of the United States Exploring Expedition (1838–42) under Lieutenant Charles Wilkes.

See also
 List of glaciers in the Antarctic
 Glaciology

References

Glaciers of Wilkes Land